The Holy Trinity Church, St. Christopher House and Parsonage is a historic Episcopal church located at 312-316 and 332 East 88th Street on the Upper East Side of Manhattan in New York City. The building was built in 1897.

It was added to the National Register of Historic Places in 1980.

See also
National Register of Historic Places listings in Manhattan from 59th to 110th Streets
List of New York City Designated Landmarks in Manhattan from 59th to 110th Streets

External links

Church website

References

Properties of religious function on the National Register of Historic Places in Manhattan
Churches completed in 1897
Churches in Manhattan
Upper East Side
New York City Designated Landmarks in Manhattan